Akilotoa (subtitled Anthology 1994–2006) is the first greatest hits album by Australian vocal duo, Vika and Linda. The album is a two-disc, 28-track collection spanning 12 years from 1994 to 2006 and includes songs from five studio albums Vika and Linda, Princess Tabu, Two Wings, Love Is Mighty Close and Between Two Shores as well as live albums Live and Acoustic and Tell the Angels, a re-recorded version of "Down by the Jetty" and "Never Let Me Go" by The Black Sorrows. The album debuted at number 1 on the ARIA Charts, earning the duo their first number one album. In doing so, they became the first Australian sister duo to top the ARIA Albums Chart.

Background
The title references their family heritage from Tonga. Vika Bull said "The title is pronounced exactly as it reads [and] it has lots of different meaning in Tongan. It actually means 'cascading' in the Tongan dictionary."
About the album's release, the duo said "It's like a little stepping stone before we go into the next part of our career. It was always on the back burner. We had productive years and then there's been a bit of a gap. Before we do a new record we want to acknowledge the past and then we can move on. We are proud of it."

Release and promotion
To coincide with the release, Vika and Linda hosted a virtual album launch with a live performance and question and answer with Brian Nankervis, which was live-streamed on their Facebook page on 21 June 2020.

Critical reception
Zoë Radas from Stack Magazine wrote: "The voices of Vika and Linda Bull have marinaded our ears in gorgeous sound waves for almost four decades" describing their sound as "unique, supple, and always bursting with spirit."

Kathy McCabe from Perth Now felt that "You forget just how many great songs they have until you run down the track list. Their regular appearances at festivals in the past decade coupled with their new social media fandom, has given their audience a generational refresh."

Track listing

Charts

Release history

See also
 List of number-one albums of 2020 (Australia)

References

2020 greatest hits albums
Vika and Linda albums
Bloodlines (record label) compilation albums
Compilation albums by Australian artists